Eurytomocharis eragrostidis is a species of wasp in the family Eurytomidae. It is a stem-boring pest that infests teff plants in the United States.

References

Eurytomidae
Insect pests of millets